Dragutin "Drago" Čelić (born 19 August 1962) is a Croatian retired professional footballer.

International career
Čelić made his debut for Croatia in an October 1990 friendly match against the United States and earned a total of 3 caps scoring no goals. His final international was a June 1993 friendly against Ukraine. The first two matches were unofficial since Croatia was still part of Yugoslavia at that time.

References

External links
 
 Dragutin Čelić at fussballportal.de 
 Dragutin Čelić at HNS 
 Article about 1999/2000 season 

1962 births
Living people
Sportspeople from Imotski
Association football defenders
Association football midfielders
Yugoslav footballers
Croatian footballers
Croatia international footballers
NK Solin players
HNK Hajduk Split players
Hertha BSC players
FC Carl Zeiss Jena players
FC Linz players
RNK Split players
Yugoslav Second League players
Yugoslav First League players
Bundesliga players
2. Bundesliga players
Austrian Football Bundesliga players
Croatian expatriate footballers
Expatriate footballers in Germany
Croatian expatriate sportspeople in Germany
Expatriate footballers in Austria
Croatian expatriate sportspeople in Austria
RNK Split managers